Glam Sam and His Combo is an electronic music project by Mats Samuelsson from Stockholm, Sweden.

History 
Mats Samuelsson, born in 1965 in Linköping, first played in an indie-jazz pop duo and then went back to university. Later on he has been working as journalist and free author. In 2008 he developed the idea of Glam Sam and His Combo as a jazzy-funky music project with himself acting as Glam Sam. The debut Groovy was released at Lemongrassmusic in 2009. 

The German label discovered the Swedish producer and signed him immediately. The longplayer which unites elements of jazz, funk, rock, hip hop techno and disco sounds has received good critiques.

After the release of the single "The Last Days of Disco", the second album The Paradise Groove was released in summer 2010 placing particular emphasis on serving the dancefloor. Critiques in many countries were all positive.

In January 2012, the EP The Riviera Sessions was released, containing more jazz and downtempo elements than the previous releases.  Several EP releases followed, as well as a greatest hits compilation and then, in 2015, a new album called Stockholm City Soul emerged. Mr Glam Sam continued to release singles in the following years but focused more on his fiction writing.

In the beginning of 2023 he entered his Coolsville Sounds Studio again to produce tracks for his comeback. The cool and jazzy groove of Lost In The Art World was released on 10 March and immediately got airplay on quality soul and jazz stations in England such as Solar Radio and Jazz FM. The year of 2023 will see several new releases from the producer.

Discography

Albums 
 2009: Groovy! (Lemongrassmusic)
 2010: The Paradise Groove (Lemongrassmusic)
 2014: Feeling Groovy - Glam Sam's Greatest Hits (Lemongrassmusic)
 2015: Stockholm City Soul (Lemongrassmusic)

EPs 

 2012: The Riviera Sessions  (Lemongrassmusic)
 2012: The Brooklyn Sessions (Lemongrassmusic)
 2013: The Coolsville Sessions (Lemongrassmusic)
 2013: Disco Will Never Die (Lemongrassmusic)

Singles 
 2010: "The Last Days of Disco" feat. Biker Boy (Lemongrassmusic)
 2017: "Modern Classics, Vol. 1" (Coolsville Sounds)
 2017: "Modern Classics, Vol. 2" (Coolsville Sounds)
 2017: "Modern Classics, Vol. 3" (Coolsville Sounds)
 2018: "Fly Cool, Fly High" (Coolsville Sounds)
 2020: "The Concept Of The Boogie" (Coolsville Sounds)
 2020: "Back From The Future" (Coolsville Sounds)
 2023: "Lost In The Art World" (Coolsville Sounds)

References

External links
 Glam Sam And His Combo at AllMusic
 Glam Sam And His Combo at Discogs
 Glam Sam And His Combo at www.lemongrassmusic.de

Drum and bass duos
Musical groups from Stockholm
Swedish electronic music groups
Trip hop groups